Goran Simov (born 31 March 1975) is a Serbian retired football goalkeeper of Macedonian descent who last played with FK Sileks before retiring.

Career
Born in Belgrade, Yugoslav and Serbian capital, he played in the youth team and started his senior career with FK Čukarički. In 1998, he moved to FK Mogren and, after a short half season spell, signed with Radnički Niš. In January 2000, he moved to a Belgrade-based club FK Milicionar. In 2001, he signed with the 1998 national champions FK Obilić. He also played in FK Hajduk Beograd before moving to Macedonia where he played first for FK Makedonija Gjorče Petrov and, since 2008, in FK Sileks, both playing in the Macedonian Prva Liga.

He played with FK Obilić and FK Makedonija Gjorče Petrov in the European competitions.

Honours
Makedonija Gj. P.
Macedonian Cup: 2005-06

Vardar
First Macedonian Football League: 2011-12, 2012-13

References

External links
 
 Profile and stats until 2003 at Dekisa.Tripod
 

1975 births
Living people
Footballers from Belgrade
Serbian people of Macedonian descent
Association football goalkeepers
Serbian footballers
FK Čukarički players
FK Mogren players
FK Radnički Niš players
FK Milicionar players
FK Obilić players
FK Hajduk Beograd players
FK Makedonija Gjorče Petrov players
FK Sileks players
FK Vardar players
Dong Thap FC players
Serbian expatriate footballers
Expatriate footballers in North Macedonia
Serbian expatriate sportspeople in North Macedonia
Expatriate footballers in Vietnam
Serbian expatriate sportspeople in Vietnam
Serbian football managers
FK Sileks managers
Serbian expatriate football managers
Expatriate football managers in North Macedonia